Canachagala Mountain is a summit located in Central New York Region of New York located in the Town of Ohio in Herkimer County, north of Wilmurt. Canachagala Lake is located north of Canachagala Mountain.

References

Mountains of Herkimer County, New York
Mountains of New York (state)